Orlov may refer to:

Places  

Orlov, Russia (Orlova), several inhabited localities in Russia
Orlov, Stará Ľubovňa District, village in Eastern Slovakia
Orlová, a town in Moravian-Silesian Region, Czech Republic

People
Orlov (family), Russian nobility
Orlov (surname) (including Orlova)

Other
Orlov (crater), lunar crater
Orlov Revolt, 18th-cen. incident in  Russo-Turkish War
Orlov Trotter,  breed of horse, named after the Russian family
Orlov, or Veal Orloff, 19th-century Franco-Russian cuisine item
  Orlov (diamond)

See also
 Orlav, a character in the film 30 Days of Night: Red Snow
Orloff (disambiguation)